Kogyae Strict Nature Reserve (or Kogyae) is a strict nature reserve, located near Kumasi, Ghana. The Kogyae Strict Nature Reserve was established in 1971 and has an area of 386 km2. Animals present on the reserve include African buffalos, African civets, civet cats, and monkeys, as well as 85 species of birds. The reserve has taken the waterbuck as its symbol.

References

Parks in Ghana
Tourist attractions in Ghana
Ramsar sites in Ghana